Clara Padilla Jones was an American politician and businesswoman who served as the 19th secretary of state of New Mexico from 1983 to 1986.

Career 
Padilla Jones was previously the chair of the Bernalillo County, New Mexico Democratic Party. During her tenure as secretary of state, she was a member of the National Association of Secretaries of State executive committee. Outside of politics, Padilla Jones worked as a realtor.

References 

Living people
Secretaries of State of New Mexico
Date of birth missing (living people)
New Mexico Democrats
Year of birth missing (living people)